Alessandro De Leidi (born 23 April 1991) is an Italian footballer who plays as a defender.

Club career 
Born in Bergamo, De Leidi graduated from hometown's Atalanta's youth system. In June 2011 he joined Foggia on loan, making his senior debuts with the Serie C1 side he closed his first season among the professionals with 22 league appearances. On 13 July 2012 he moved to Barletta in a co-ownership deal. With the team he disputed another 22 games of the Lega Pro Prima Divisione.

After appearing regularly during the season, Barletta bought the other half of De Leidi's rights on 21 June 2013. However, two months later, he joined Cittadella in Serie B.
He played for Cittadella for 3 seasons collecting 35 appearances in total in Serie B and he disputed 6 games in Lega Pro Prima Divisione.

Domestic League Records

References

External links

1991 births
Living people
Footballers from Bergamo
Italian footballers
Association football defenders
Serie B players
Atalanta B.C. players
Calcio Foggia 1920 players
A.S.D. Barletta 1922 players
A.S. Cittadella players
S.S. Racing Club Fondi players
Serie C players